Sutton Coldfield is a constituency represented in the House of Commons of the UK Parliament since 2001 by Andrew Mitchell, a Conservative.

Members of Parliament

Constituency profile
Workless claimants, registered jobseekers,  were in November 2012 significantly lower than the national average of 3.8%, at 2.6% of the population based on a statistical compilation by The Guardian.  At that date the regional average stood at 4.7%

Within Birmingham, the Conservatives have 11 councillors in this seat, with Labour's one councillor in the Sutton Vesey ward.

Boundaries

The constituency covers the northern part of the City of Birmingham.  It corresponds to the former borough of Sutton Coldfield.

2010–present: The City of Birmingham wards of Sutton Four Oaks, Sutton New Hall, Sutton Trinity, and Sutton Vesey.

1983–2010: The City of Birmingham wards of Sutton Four Oaks, Sutton New Hall, and Sutton Vesey.

1974–1983: The Municipal Borough of Sutton Coldfield.

1955–1974: The Municipal Borough of Sutton Coldfield, and the County Borough of Birmingham ward of Erdington.

1945–1955: The Municipal Borough of Sutton Coldfield, and the Rural Districts of Meriden and Tamworth.

History
This area contributed to the old seat of North Warwickshire or the 'Tamworth' division of Warwickshire, which remains in a much narrower form as the largely suburban town to the north has developed.

Political history
All MPs elected since the constituency's creation in 1945 have been Conservative.  Sutton Coldfield is, on the length of party representation measure combined with numerical majority, among the safest seats in the country for the party; they have received a majority of votes in the seat and its predecessors since 1885. 
The Conservative party's vote share of 68.9% in the constituency in 1979 would not be matched for 38 years, when the Conservatives received a higher share in South Holland and the Deepings, where they received 69.9%. Their lowest majority since the initial 1945 Labour landslide election was achieved in 2001, which still stood at a healthy 10,000 and a 50.4% share of the vote, and enabled Andrew Mitchell to make his return to Parliament.

Prominent frontbench members
Geoffrey Lloyd (later created a life peer as Baron Geoffrey-Lloyd) was for four years the Minister of Fuel and Power then Minister of Education for two years mostly under the Third Churchill ministry then Macmillan Ministry.

Former Cabinet minister Sir Norman Fowler served the seat from 1974 until retiring as an MP in 2001.  Departments he led during the Thatcher ministry were transport, social services and then employment.  Now Lord Fowler, he was Lord Speaker from September 2016 until April 2021.
 
Andrew Mitchell, MP here since 2001 and previously MP for Gedling from 1987 to 1997, was Secretary of State for International Development then briefly Conservative Chief Whip while in Coalition Government 2010-2015, until standing down after swearing at police while attempting to take his bicycle through the main gates of Downing Street in 2012.

Elections

Elections in the 2010s

Elections in the 2000s

Elections in the 1990s

Elections in the 1980s

Elections in the 1970s

Elections in the 1960s

Elections in the 1950s

Elections in the 1940s

See also
 List of parliamentary constituencies in the West Midlands (county)
 Sutton Coldfield

Notes

References

External links 
 Birmingham city council constituency page

Parliamentary constituencies in Birmingham, West Midlands
Constituencies of the Parliament of the United Kingdom established in 1945
Sutton Coldfield